Cartoonito is a programming block that airs on weekday mornings. It premiered on September 13, 2021, on Cartoon Network, and a dedicated section on the streaming service HBO Max. Cartoonito targets a preschool audience around two to six years old. Cartoonito marks the first dedicated preschool block on Cartoon Network in over fifteen years.

History

Background

In 1996, Cartoon Network created a Sunday morning block of preschool programs. It featured series such as Big Bag, a live-action/puppet television program by the Children's Television Workshop, Small World, and Cave Kids. However, Big Bag ran until 1998, while Small World ran until 2002. Once Big Bag left Cartoon Network's lineup in 2001, Baby Looney Tunes, along with Pecola, Sitting Ducks, and Hamtaro, filled that space in 2003. The block moved to weekday mornings afterward.

On August 22, 2005, Cartoon Network USA debuted Tickle-U, the network's first official attempt at weekday-morning preschool programming block. The block aired 2 hours from 9 a.m. to 11 a.m. It featured domestic and foreign-imported series targeted at preschool-age children like its competitors Nick Jr. (on Nickelodeon) and Playhouse Disney (now Disney Junior on Disney Channel). The hosts were two animated CGI characters: a red butterfly-like creature named Pipoca and a yellow rabbit-like creature named Henderson.

Programs on the lineup included Firehouse Tales (the only original series), Gerald McBoing-Boing, Harry and His Bucket Full of Dinosaurs (both from Teletoon/Treehouse TV, the former being the only co-production), and British series such as Gordon the Garden Gnome, Little Robots, Peppa Pig and Yoko! Jakamoko! Toto!, some of which were re-dubbed for American audiences. The block came under criticized by the CCFC, for its marketing strategies. Tickle-U closed on January 6, 2006, some of its programmings still aired on Cartoon Network until 2007 and as part of the schedule of the British variation of Cartoonito.

Launch
On June 14, 2021, new idents of the block appeared on videos (which includes Esme & Roy, Mush-Mush & the Mushables, Care Bears: Unlock the Magic, and Love Monster) on Cartoonito's YouTube channel, and a newsletter was announced, with a new banner and avatar on the Cartoonito YouTube Channel in July. A trailer for the block was released on July 29, 2021.

On August 16, 2021, the launch date was announced for September 13, 2021; Baby Looney Tunes would be the first show to air on the block. The television block initially ran for 8 hours (6:00 a.m. to 2:00 p.m. ET/PT) on weekdays and 2 hours (6:00 a.m. to 8:00 a.m. ET/PT) on weekends.

On November 16, 2021, the weekday schedule decreased to seven hours (ending at 1:00 p.m. ET/PT). It later dropped another hour (ending at 12:00 p.m. ET/PT) on December 20, 2021. The block ceased airing on weekends on January 29, 2022, while the weekday schedule dropped yet another hour (ending at 11:00 a.m. ET/PT), reducing Cartoonito to a total of five hours as of January 31, 2022.

In June 2022, the schedule lost another hour (ending at 10:00 a.m. ET/PT) but reverted on September 5. However, October 3 marked the first time the start-up changed. Instead of the usual 6 a.m. time slot, Cartoonito would begin at 7 a.m. after a regular Cartoon Network program, retaining its four hours.

Programming

Cartoonito features co-productions and acquired programming, in addition to original series exclusive to the program block on Cartoon Network. Currently, Cartoonito's lineup includes Sesame Street: Mecha Builders, Bugs Bunny Builders, Batwheels, Cocomelon, and Thomas & Friends: All Engines Go; with Sesame Street exclusive to HBO Max.

Related services

International

Since its inception, Cartoonito has rolled out across European territories through various nations and regional feeds. Following its global reintroduction in 2021, the brand has expanded to regions such as Latin America, Africa, and several Asia-Pacific countries.

See also
 Cartoon Network
 Boomerang
 Discovery Family
 Tiny TV
 HBO Max
 BabyFirst
 Disney Junior
 Nick Jr.
 Noggin (brand)
 Universal Kids

References

External links

 

Cartoonito
2021 establishments in the United States
Cartoon Network programming blocks
Preschool education television networks
Television programming blocks in the United States
Television networks in the United States
Cartoon Network
Warner Bros. Discovery networks
Companies based in Atlanta